A referendum on the approval of the Galician Statute of Autonomy was held in Galicia on Saturday, 4 July 1936. Voters were asked whether they ratified a proposed draft Statute of Autonomy Galicia. Article 12 of the Spanish Constitution of 1931 allowed for Spanish provinces to be organized into "autonomous regions", provided that a regional Statute was proposed by a majority of the provinces' municipalities comprising at least two-thirds of the provincial population and that two-thirds majority of all those eligible to vote accepted the draft Statute.

The referendum resulted in 99.4% of valid votes in support of the draft Statute on a turnout of 74.5%, representing 74.0% of the electorate. However, the outbreak of the Spanish Civil War prevented the draft Statute from being submitted to the Spanish Cortes for its final approval.

Results

See also
1931 Catalan Statute of Autonomy referendum
1933 Basque Statute of Autonomy referendum

References

Galicia
1936 in Galicia (Spain)
1936 referendums
July 1936 events
Referendums in Galicia (Spain)